Petter Næss (born 14 March 1960 in Oslo, Norway) is a Norwegian actor and film director. His first film as a director was the comedy Absolutt blåmandag in 1999. Næss is best known for his work directing two of the three films about Ingvar Ambjørnsen's Elling character, Elling (2000), which was nominated for the foreign language film Oscar and Elsk meg i morgen (Love Me Tomorrow), (2005), in addition to Bare Bea (2003), Mozart and the Whale (2005) and Hoppet (The Jump, 2007) in Sweden. In 2008, Næss portrayed the war hero Martin Linge in the movie Max Manus.

Otherwise, he has primarily occupied himself in the world of plays and revues, both as a scriptwriter, director and actor. Since 1997, he has been employed as a director at Oslo Nye Teater, and was, among other plays, responsible for the critically acclaimed stage version of Elling and Kjell Bjarne.

Movies
Næss started as an actor in theater, film and TV in 1985. Since 1996, he has worked as film director and projectleader at Oslo Nye Teater.  In 1999, he debuted with his first movie, Absolutt blåmandag. The success with the movie "Elling" sent Petter Næss to Hollywood. In 2005, he instructed among others Josh Hartnett in the American drama-comedy Mozart and the Whale. In 2007, was he current with the Norwegian comedy Tatt Av Kvinnen and in 2008, he played Kaptein Martin Linge in the movie Max Manus. In 1980, he was a rep assistant on two movies about "Olsenbanden".

References

External links

Norwegian film directors
1960 births
Living people